The Honda MH02 was an experimental business jet built by Honda, in cooperation with Mississippi State University, to research engine placement and composite construction. The prototype was completed in 1992, making its first flight on 5 March 1993.

The MH02 was never intended for production, but was nonetheless the first all-composite light business jet to fly; by 1996 over 170 test flight hours were accumulated on the airframe. Aside from the already unusual above-the-wing engine mounts, the design features a T-tail and a forward-swept wing. The aircraft was deregistered and exported to Japan in 1998.

Specifications (MH02)

See also

 VFW-Fokker 614: Twin overwing jet engines
 HFB 320 Hansa Jet: Forward-swept wing

Notes

External links

 Honda Worldwide
 HondaJet

Forward-swept-wing aircraft
MH02
1990s Japanese experimental aircraft
Aircraft first flown in 1993
Mississippi State University aircraft
1990s United States experimental aircraft
Twinjets